Paid in Full  is a 2002 American crime drama film directed by Charles Stone III. The characters Ace (Wood Harris), Mitch (Mekhi Phifer), and Rico (Cam'ron), are fictionally based on the 1980s Harlem drug dealers Azie "AZ" Faison, Rich Porter, and Alpo Martinez. The title of the film is borrowed from the 1987 album and song by Eric B. & Rakim.

Plot
Ace is a young man living with his mom and sister in the Harlem ghetto working a dead-end job at a dry cleaning shop. His sister Dora’s boyfriend, Calvin, is a successful cocaine dealer while Ace's close friend Mitch is a flashy, popular drug dealer. Despite both of them promising a life of easy money, expensive cars and women, Ace decides to live a law-abiding life. While at work, Ace finds some cocaine in one of his customers’ pants. The customer, Lulu, is a cocaine supplier who lets Ace keep the drug. When Calvin gets arrested on drug charges, Ace runs into one of his customers and easily sells him the cocaine for $100. Impressed, Ace goes back to Lulu for more cocaine to sell.

Lulu has a top-quality supply of cocaine which Ace sells on the street at a cheap price, quickly luring away customers from other drug dealers. Ace starts wholesaling his product to other dealers in the neighborhood, believing everyone can make money and be happy. Meanwhile, Mitch is arrested for killing a stickup man who robbed one of his workers. When a fight breaks out between Mitch and another inmate, Mitch is aided by East Harlem inmate Rico who impresses Mitch by his ferocity and show of support. Mitch is able to beat his murder charge and both him and Rico join Ace's drug empire when released from prison. The trio become wealthy, buying foreign cars, jewelry and expensive champagne. Ace maintains a low profile, Mitch returns to his life as the popular hustler while Rico is a ruthless enforcer who worries Ace with his overzealous, high-profile behavior.

When Calvin is released from prison, Ace agrees to give him product to sell in his old drug spot, but Calvin quickly becomes dissatisfied with what he feels is a marginal position. When Ace refuses to let Calvin run his old block, Calvin retaliates by attempting to rob Ace at his Aunt June's apartment, holding June and Dora hostage. When Ace is unable to open the safe, June and Dora are executed by Calvin as another associate shoots Ace in the head, leaving him for dead. Despite his wounds, Ace survives as his girlfriend Keisha gives birth to his baby the same night. Feeling the physical and psychological effects of the shooting, Ace decides to quit the drug trade.

Rico tries to assuage Ace's concerns by revealing that he killed Calvin to show potential enemies that the organization is strong. Ace strongly disagrees with Rico's initiative and remains steadfast in his position to retire. Mitch understands Ace's perspective that the drug game does not reciprocate any love or generosity. Mitch decides to stay in the drug game because he loves the hustle, comparing himself to professional basketball players that continue to chase glory despite having enough money to retire. Ace decides to let Mitch and Rico take over, vowing to introduce Mitch to his drug supplier.

While Ace is recovering, Mitch's kid brother Sonny is kidnapped for ransom. Mitch reaches out to Ace who provides him with enough cocaine to pay Sonny's ransom and allow Mitch and Rico to resume business. Mitch enlists Rico to help sell the cocaine to pay the ransom, but Rico instead kills Mitch and steals the cocaine. Suspicious, Ace questions Rico who claims he had not seen Mitch the day he was killed. Ace knows he's lying and settles the issue by giving him the contact to a pair of undercover FBI agents he had spoken to and avoided previously. Rico is arrested and is last seen in custody giving up information on his drug connections in Washington D.C. in order to avoid a 25-to-life sentence. He refuses to inform on anyone in Harlem, intending on reclaiming his position when he is eventually released from prison. Sonny's kidnapping and subsequent murder were orchestrated by his own uncle who resented Mitch for not providing him with money and for kicking him out of his family's apartment. Ace retreats from the criminal underworld and makes a new life for himself and his family using diamonds that he previously found in Lulu's apartment.

Cast
 Wood Harris – Ace
 Mekhi Phifer – Mitch
 Cam'ron – Rico
 Kevin Carroll – Calvin
 Esai Morales – Luis "Lulu" Lujano
 Chi McBride – Pip
 Remo Green – Sonny
 Cynthia Martells – Dora
 Elise Neal – June
 Regina Hall – Keisha (based on Rich's sister Pat)
 Ron Cephas Jones – Ice (based on Rich's uncle Apple)
 Karen Andrew – Cakes
 Jonas Chernick – Detective / Surgeon
 Wes Williams – Mitch's Friend
 Rufus Crawford – Tommy
 Jason Burke – Street Runner
 K. C. Collins – Kid #1
 Arnold Pinnock – Wiry Man
 Noreaga – Runner
 Doug E. Fresh – Himself

Critical reception
The film received generally mixed reviews from critics, gaining a 53% (rotten) rating on Rotten Tomatoes based on 43 reviews and a score of 49% on Metacritic based on 16 reviews. However, it has gained a strong cult following amongst hip-hop fans over the years.

Soundtrack

The Paid in Full (soundtrack), containing hip hop and R&B music, was released on November 26, 2002 by Roc-A-Fella Records and Def Jam Recordings. It peaked at 53 on the Billboard 200 and 10 on the Top R&B/Hip-Hop Albums.

See also
 List of hood films

References

External links
 
 

2000s English-language films
2002 films
2000s American films
2000s hip hop films
American crime drama films
African-American films
Hood films
Films about African-American organized crime
Crime films based on actual events
Films directed by Charles Stone III
Films produced by Jay-Z
Dimension Films films
Films set in New York City